John J. Taylor (born April 9, 1955) is an American legislator who served as a member of the Pennsylvania House of Representatives from the 177th Legislative District of Pennsylvania, from 1984 - 2018.  He was Republican Chairman of the House Liquor Control Committee and a member of the House Urban Affairs Committee. Taylor was the chairman of the Republican City Committee from June 2013 to February 2016.

Career
Taylor was first elected in 1984 at the age of 29, defeating incumbent Rep. Gerald McMonagle to represent the Kensington section of Philadelphia.  He has been re-elected to every succeeding session of the House.

Taylor is of counsel to the Philadelphia law firm of Pelino & Lentz P.C. Taylor is Ward Leader of the 25th Ward Republican Executive Committee in Philadelphia.

Taylor announced he would not seek re-election to the House in September 2017. The subsequent election was won by Joseph C. Hohenstein. He succeeded Taylor in January 2019.

Personal
Taylor is a 1980 graduate of the University of Central Florida in 1980 and earned his juris doctor at Temple University School of Law in 1984.

He resides in the Northwood section of Philadelphia with his wife, Evelyn.  They have four children, two sons and two daughters.

References

External links
Representative John Taylor's official web site

21st-century American politicians
Republican Party members of the Pennsylvania House of Representatives
Politicians from Philadelphia
Temple University Beasley School of Law alumni
University of Central Florida alumni
1955 births
Living people